Thailand's Psychotropic Substances Act is a law designed to regulate certain mind-altering drugs. According to the Office of the Narcotics Control Board, "The Act directly resulted from the Convention on Psychotropic Substances 1971 of which Thailand is a party." The Act divides psychotropic drugs into four Schedules. Offenses involving Schedule I and II drugs carry heavier penalties than those involving Schedule III and IV drugs. Note that this statute does not regulate most opioids, cocaine, or some amphetamines. The vast majority of narcotic painkillers, along with cocaine and most amphetamines are regulated under the Narcotics Act.

Schedule I
Some examples include:
 Cathinone ((-)-a-Amino-propiophenone)
 Etryptamine (3-(2-aminobutyl) indole)
 Mescaline (3,4,5-Trimethoxyphenethylamine)
 Methcathinone (2-(methylamino)-1-phenylpropan-1-one)
 Psilocin (3-(2-Dimethylaminoethyl)-4-hydroxyindole)
 Psilocybine (3-(2-Dimethylaminoethyl)-indol-4-yl dihydrogen phosphate)
 Tetrahydrocannabinol (1-Hydroxy-3-pentyl-6 a, 7,10,10 a-tetrahydro-6,6,9-trimethyl-6H-dibenzo [b,d] pyran)

Schedule II
Some examples include:
 Amfepramone (2-(Diethylamino) propiophenone)
 Aminorex (2-amino-5-phenyl-2-oxazoline)
 Butorphanol (17-(cyclobutymethyl) morphinan 3, 14-diol)
 Cathine (d-threo-2-Amino-1-hydroxy- 1- phenylpropane)
 Fencamfamin ((+)-N-Ethyl-3-phenylbicyclo-(2,2,1)-heptan-2-amine)
 Fenethylline ((+)-3,7-Dihydro-1,3-dimethyl-7-(2-[(1-methyl-2-phenyl-ethyl) amino]-ethyl)-1H-purine-2,6-dione)
 Flunitrazepam (5-(o-Fluorophenyl)-1,3-dihydro-1-methyl-7-nitro-2H-1, 4-benzodiazepin-2-one)
 Ketamine (Cyclohexanone, 2-(2-chlorophenyl)-2-(methylamino))
 Mazindol (5-(p-Chlorophenyl)-2,5-dihydro-3H-imidazo [2,1-a]-isoindol-5-o1)
 Methaqualone (2-methyl-3-o-tolyl-4(3H)-quinazolinone)
 Methylphenidate (2-Phenyl-2-(2-piperidyl) acetic acid, methyl ester)
 Nimetazepam (1,3-Dihydro-1-methyl-7-nitro-5-phenyl-2H-1,4-benzo-diazepin-2-one)
 Pemoline (2-Amino-5-phenyl-4(5H)-oxazolone)
 Pentobarbital (5-Ethyl-5-(1-methylbutyl) barbituric acid)
 Phencyclidine (1-(1-Phenyl-cyclohexyl)-piperidine)
 Secobarbital (5-Allyl-5-(1-methylbutyl) barbituric acid)
 Temazepam (7-Chloro-1,3-dihydro-3-hydroxy-1-methyl-5-phenyl-2H-1, 4-benzodiazepin-2-one)
 Triazolam (8-Chloro-6-(o-Chlorophenyl)-1-methyl-4H-s-triazolo [4,3-a] [1,4] benzodiazepine)

Schedule III
Some examples include:
 Amobarbital (5-Ethyl-5-(3-methylbutyl) barbituric acid)
 Brotizolam (2-Bromo-4-(2-chlorophenyl)-9-methyl-6H-thieno [3,2-f] [1,2,4,] triazolo-[4,3-a] [1,4] diazepine)
 Buprenorphine (21-Cyclopropyl-7-α-[(s)-1-hydroxy-1,2,2-trimethylpropyl]-6, 14-endo-ethano-6,7,8, 14-tetrahydrooripavine)
 Butalbital (5-Allyl-5-isobutylbarbituric acid)
 Cyclobarbital (5-(1-Cyclohexen-1-yl)-5-ethylbarbituric acid)
 Flutoprazepam (7-chloro-1-cyclopropylmethyl-1,3-dihydro-5-(2-fluorophenyl)-2H-1,4-benzodiazepin-2-one)
 Glutethimide (2-Ethyl-2-phenyl-glutarimide)
 Loprazolam (6-(o-Chlorophenyl)-2,4 dihydro-2-[(4-methyl-1-piperazinyl) methylene]-8-nitro-1H-imidazo [1,2-a] [1,4] benzodiazepin-1-one)
 Lormetazepam (7-Chloro-5-(o-chlorophenyl)-1,3-dihydro-3-hydroxy-1-methyl- 2H-1,4-benzodiazepin-2-one)
 Midazolam (8-Chloro-6-(2-fluorophenyl)-1-methyl-4H-imidazo-(1,5-a) (1,4) benzodiazepine)
 Meprobamate (2-Methyl-2-propyl-1,3-propanediol dicarbamate)
 Nitrazepam (1,3-Dihydro-7-nitro-5-phenyl-2H-1,4-benzodiazepin-2-one)
 Pentazocine (1, 2, 3, 4, 5, 6-Hexahydro-6, 11-dimethyl-3-(3-methyl-2-butenyl)-2, 6- methano-3-benzazocin-8-ol)

Schedule IV
Some examples include:
 Allobarbital (5,5-diallybarbituric acid)
 Alprazolam (8-chloro-1-methyl-6-phenyl-4H-s-triazolo [4,3-a] [1,4] benzodiazepine)
 Barbital (5, 5-diethylbarbituric acid)
 Benzphetamine (N-benzyl-N, α -dimethylphenethylamine)
 Bromazepam (7-bromo-1,3-dihydro-5-(2-pyridyl)-2H-1,4- benzodiazepin-2-one)
 Butobarbital (5-butyl-5-ethylbarbituric acid)
 Camazepam (7-Chloro-1,3-dihydro-3-hydroxy-1-methyl-5-phenyl-2H-1, 4 benzodiazepin-2-one dimethylcarbamate)
 Chloral hydrate and its adducts
 Chlordiazepoxide (7-chloro-2-(methylamino)-5-phenyl-3H-1, 4-benzodiazepine- 4- oxide)
 Clobazam (7-Chloro-1-methyl-5-phenyl-1H-1,5-benzodiazepine-2,4-(3H, 5H)-dione)
 Clonazepam (5-(o-Chlorophenyl)-1, 3-dihydro-7-nitro-2H-1, 4-benzodiazepin-2-one)
 Clortermine (2-chloro- α, α -demethyl benzeneethanamine)
 Diazepam (7-Chloro-1,3-dihydro-1-methyl-5-phenyl-2H-1,4-benzodiazepin-2-one)
 Ethchlorvynol (ethyl-2-chlorovinyl-ethinyicabinol)
 Lorazepam (7-Chloro-5(o-chlorophenyl)-1,3-dihydro-3-hydroxy-2H-1, 4-benzodiazepin-2-one)
 Mefenorex ((±)-N(3-chloropropyl)-a-methylphenethylamine)
 Oxazepam (7-Chloro-1,3-dihydro-3-hydroxy-5-phenyl-2H-1,4-benzodiazepin-2-one)
 Phenobarbital (5-ethyl-5-phenylbarbituric acid)
 Propylhexedrine ((±)-N,a-Dimethylcyclohexane-ethylamine)
 Tetrazepam (7-Chloro-5-(cyclohexen-1-yl)-1,3-dihydro-1-methyl-2H-1, 4-benzodiazepin-2-one)
 Vinylbital (5-(1-methylbutyl)-5-vinylbarbituric acid)

References
  Controlled Psychotropic Substances - FDA
Drug control law
Thai legislation
Drug policy of Thailand